Pseudopostega constricta is a moth of the family Opostegidae. It was described by Donald R. Davis and Jonas R. Stonis, 2007. It is known from the state of Chiapas in southern Mexico.

The length of the forewings is 3.7–5 mm. Adults have been recorded in June.

Etymology
The species name is derived from the Latin constrictus (meaning drawn together, contracted) in reference to the strongly constricted male gnathos.

References

Opostegidae
Moths described in 2007